Kiss Me, Kill Me is a 2015 American film.

Kiss Me, Kill Me may also refer to:

 Kiss Me, Kill Me, a 1976 TV drama film directed by Michael O'Herlihy
 An alternative title of the 1973 Italian film Baba Yaga
 An alternative title of the 1982 American film Tag: The Assassination Game
 An alternative title of the 2009 South Korean film Kill Me

See also 
 Kill Me Kiss Me (disambiguation)